Claudiu Dumitru Pascariu (born 25 October 1988) is Romanian footballer who plays as a defender.

Club statistics

Updated to games played as of 3 March 2013.

References

External links
 
 
 Claudiu Pascariu at fupa.net

1988 births
Living people
Sportspeople from Arad, Romania
Romanian footballers
Association football defenders
Liga I players
Liga II players
Nemzeti Bajnokság I players
FC UTA Arad players
ASA 2013 Târgu Mureș players
Budapest Honvéd FC players
FC Bihor Oradea players
CS Șoimii Pâncota players
CS Crișul Chișineu-Criș players
Romanian expatriate footballers
Romanian expatriate sportspeople in Hungary
Expatriate footballers in Hungary
Romanian expatriate sportspeople in Germany
Expatriate footballers in Germany